Tomáš Dujka (born 10 December 1982) is a retired professional Czech football player who played in the Czech First League for FC Tescoma Zlín and SFC Opava.

References

External links
 
 

1982 births
Living people
Czech footballers
Czech Republic youth international footballers
Czech Republic under-21 international footballers
Association football midfielders
Czech First League players
FC Fastav Zlín players
SFC Opava players
FC Vysočina Jihlava players